HB Køge Kvindeelite, commonly known as HB Køge, (previously HB Køge Pigefodbold), is a Danish women's football club based in Køge, Denmark. The club is currently playing in the Elitedivisionen and like the men's team, they play their home matches at the Capelli Sport Stadion.

History
In January 2020, the club entered into partnership with Capelli Sport and the American Football Academy Slammers FC. The goal for the team is to participate in the UEFA Women's Champions League within five years and in the women's section receive the same terms as the men's team. The former football player and success coach from Brøndby IF Peer Lisdorf, was hired as new head coach for the team. In their first season in the Elitedivisionen, Lisdorf successfully led the club to Champions League qualification for the first time in their history whilst also winning their first top-flight title.

Players

Current squad

Coaching staff

First team

Honours 
 Elitedivisionen
Winners (2): 2020–21, 2021–22
Danish Women's Cup
Semifinalist (1): 2021

European record

Overview

References

External links
 
 HB Køge at soccerdonna.de 
 HB Køge at Soccerway

HB Køge
Football clubs in Denmark
Women's football clubs in Denmark
Association football clubs established in 2009
2009 establishments in Denmark
HB Koge